New Moon Rising may refer to:

"New Moon Rising" (song), a song by Wolfmother
New Moon Rising World Tour, a concert tour by Wolfmother
"New Moon Rising" (Buffy the Vampire Slayer), an episode of the TV series
The Howling: New Moon Rising, a 1995 horror film

See also
New Moon (disambiguation)